Masood Akhtar is an Indian politician and a member of 17th Legislative Assembly of Uttar Pradesh of India. He represents the Saharanpur constituency of Uttar Pradesh and is a member of the Samajwadi Party.

Early life and education
Akhtar was born 18 April 1962 in Bhaupur village of Saharanpur district of Uttar Pradesh to his father Aslam. In 1986, he married Shama Parveen, they have two sons and two daughters. He belongs to Backward Class (Muslim Garha) community. In 1982, he attended Aligarh Muslim University and attained Bachelor of Arts degree.

Political career
Akhtar has been a member of the 17th Legislative Assembly of Uttar Pradesh. Since 2017, he has represented the Saharanpur constituency and won elections from the Indian National Congress. He joined Samajwadi party with Imran Masood just before one month of 18th Legislative Assembly election of Uttar Pradesh (2022). 

In 17th Legislative Assembly of Uttar Pradesh (2017) elections, he was elected MLA from Saharanpur by defeating Bahujan Samaj Party candidate Jagpal by a margin of 12,324 votes.

Posts held

See also
Uttar Pradesh Legislative Assembly

References

Uttar Pradesh MLAs 2017–2022
Indian National Congress politicians from Uttar Pradesh
Living people
1962 births